Oedipoda charpentieri is a species of band-winged grasshopper in the family Acrididae. It is found in southern Europe.

The IUCN conservation status of Oedipoda charpentieri is "LC", least concern, with no immediate threat to the species' survival. The IUCN status was assessed in 2014.

References

External links

 

Oedipodinae